The 2016 FIBA U16 Women's European Championship was the 28th edition of the Women's European basketball championship for national under-16 teams. Sixteen teams participated in the competition, held in Udine, Italy, from 6 to 14 August 2016.

Spain won their 10th championship title by beating Germany in the final, 64–48.

Participating teams
  (Runners-up, 2015 FIBA Europe Under-16 Championship for Women Division B)

  (Winners, 2015 FIBA Europe Under-16 Championship for Women Division B)

  (3rd place, 2015 FIBA Europe Under-16 Championship for Women Division B)

Preliminary round
In this round, the 16 teams are allocated in four groups of four teams each. All teams advance to the playoff round of 16.

Group A

Group B

Group C

Group D

Knockout stage

Bracket

5th–8th place bracket

9th–16th place bracket

Final

Final ranking

References

External links
FIBA official website

2016
2016–17 in European women's basketball
2016–17 in Italian basketball
International youth basketball competitions hosted by Italy
International women's basketball competitions hosted by Italy
Sport in Udine
2016 in youth sport
August 2016 sports events in Europe